Dutywa Stadium is a multi-use stadium in Dutywa, Eastern Cape,  South Africa.  It is currently used mostly for football matches and is the home ground of F.C. Royals and Hotspurs F.C.

Sports venues in the Eastern Cape
Soccer venues in South Africa